Peter Connor was an English professional footballer. A centre forward, his only known club was Blackpool, for whom he made four Football League appearances and scored one goal. The goal came in a 5–0 victory over Burton Wanderers on 19 September 1896.

References

Year of birth missing
Year of death missing
English footballers
Blackpool F.C. players
Association football forwards